The Western Province Cricket Association is the governing body for cricket in the Cape Town region. Its representative team, Western Province, competes in South Africa's domestic competition the Supersport Series, formerly known as the Castle Cup or the Currie Cup.

External links
 Western Province Cricket Association Home Page

Western Province Cricket Association
Cricket administration in South Africa
Sport in the Western Cape